MV Southern Prince was a cargo liner launched in 1929 for the Prince Line between New York City and Argentina. She was requisitioned by the Royal Navy for conversion to the auxiliary minelayer HMS Southern Prince. She joined the 1st Minelaying Squadron based at Kyle of Lochalsh (port ZA) laying mines for the World War II Northern Barrage. She was the largest of five ships requisitioned for this minelaying operation. She was torpedoed by  shortly after midnight on 26 August 1941 while returning from laying minefield SN-70A; but was escorted to Belfast for repair. After minelaying was completed in October 1943, she became the flagship of Rear Admiral Rivett-Carnac for Operation Neptune; and anchored off Juno Beach on 8 June 1944. She was used as an accommodation ship from October 1944 until returned to the Prince Line in 1946.

Prince Line sold her in 1947 to G. Costa fu Andrea of Genoa, who renamed her Anna C. for service between Italy and South America. She was rebuilt for improved cruise ship service in 1952, but suffered a serious fire in 1971, and was scrapped the following year.

Notes

References
 
 

Minelayers of the Royal Navy
1929 ships
World War II minelayers of the United Kingdom